The following is a list of National Collegiate Athletic Association (NCAA) Division I college lacrosse teams that have qualified for the NCAA Division I Men's Lacrosse Championship, with teams listed by number of appearances.

Individual team performance

Individual team record 

The following is a list of National Collegiate Athletic Association (NCAA) Division I college lacrosse teams that have qualified for the NCAA Division I Men's Lacrosse Championship, with teams listed by number of appearances and their tournament won-loss records.

Notes 

 (a) The NCAA does not recognize Syracuse's participation in the 1990 tournament and therefore recognizes them as participating in 29 tournaments, having a win–loss record of 59–20 (.747 win percentage), and having 10 championships.

 (b) No third-place game is held, semifinal losers credited with third-place finish

References

External links
NCAA page for men's lacrosse
All time Men's National College Lacrosse Champions

Appearances